BGST may refer to:

 Saattut Heliport (ICAO Code: BGST)
 Biblical Graduate School of Theology